A gatehouse is a type of fortified gateway, an entry control point building, enclosing or accompanying a gateway for a town, religious house, castle, manor house, or other fortification building of importance. Gatehouses are typically the most heavily armed section of a fortification, to compensate for being structurally the weakest and the most probable attack point by an enemy. There are numerous surviving examples in France, Austria, Germany, England and Japan.

History
Gatehouses made their first appearance in the early antiquity when it became necessary to protect the main entrance to a castle or town. Over time, they evolved into very complicated structures with many lines of defence. Strongly fortified gatehouses would normally include a drawbridge, one or more portcullises, machicolations, arrow loops and possibly even murder-holes where stones would be dropped on attackers. In some castles, the gatehouse was so strongly fortified it took on the function of a keep, sometimes referred to as a "gate keep". In the late Middle Ages, some of these arrow loops might have been converted into gun loops (or gun ports).

Urban defences would sometimes incorporate gatehouses such as Monnow Bridge in Monmouth. York has four important gatehouses, known as "Bars", in its city walls including the Micklegate Bar.

The French term for gatehouse is logis-porche. This could be a large, complex structure that served both as a gateway and lodging or it could have been composed of a gateway through an enclosing wall. A very large gatehouse might be called a châtelet (small castle).

At the end of the Middle Ages, many gatehouses in England and France were converted into beautiful, grand entrance structures to manor houses or estates. Many of them became a separate feature free-standing or attached to the manor or mansion only by an enclosing wall. By this time the gatehouse had lost its defensive purpose and had become more of a monumental structure designed to harmonise with the manor or mansion.

In the Dravidian architecture of South India, very tall gopuram gatehouses, usually four, dominate large Hindu temple complexes.

England

Bargate, in Hampshire is a medieval gatehouse in the city centre of Southampton, England. Constructed in 1180 as part of the Southampton town walls
Ightham Mote, in Kent has an imposing 13th and 14th century gatehouse.
Durham Castle, in Durham has an 11th-century gatehouse that is now used as accommodation for students attending University College, Durham.
Layer Marney Tower, the epitome of the Tudor gatehouse.
Stokesay Castle, a 13th-century fortified manor house in Shropshire has a Jacobean half-timbered gatehouse.
Stanway House, Stanway, Gloucestershire, where the gatehouse measures 44 ft. by 22 ft. and has three storeys.
Westwood House, Worcestershire, which has a frontage of 54 ft. with two storeys.
Burton Agnes Hall, East Riding of Yorkshire, which has three storeys and is flanked by great octagonal towers at the angles.
Hylton Castle, Hylton, Sunderland, although it is an actual castle, it is styled in the shape of a classical gatehouse (this is due to the castle being built for comfort as opposed to a castle for defence).

France
Château de Châteaubriant, two gatehouses (13th and 14th century), one for the lower bailey, one for the upper ward.
Château de Suscinio, a large 15th-century gatehouse in the logis-porte style, Morbihan, Brittany.
Château de Trécesson, a simple 14th-century gatehouse on a moated manor house in Morbihan, Brittany (see French Wikipedia page, Château de Trécesson)
Château de Vitré, a large 15th-century châtelet or gatehouse in Ille-et-Vilaine, Brittany (see French Wikipedia page, Château de Vitré)

United States
Latrobe Gate, a Greek Revival and Italianate gatehouse built in 1806, Washington, D.C.
Lorraine Park Cemetery Gate Lodge, a Queen Anne style stone and frame building constructed in 1884, Woodlawn, Baltimore County, Maryland.

See also
City gate
Gate tower
Guardhouse
Gatekeeper's lodge

References

Fortification (architectural elements)
Types of gates
Castle architecture